Lord of War is a 2005 American crime drama film written, produced, and directed by Andrew Niccol, and co-produced by and starring Nicolas Cage.

The film was released in the United States on September 16, 2005, to positive reviews and grossed $72.6 million at the box office.

Cage plays a fictional illegal arms dealer, inspired by the stories of several real-life arms dealers and smugglers, primarily Viktor Bout. The film was officially endorsed by the human rights group Amnesty International for highlighting the issue of illicit arms trafficking by the international arms industry.

Plot
In the early 1980s, Yuri Orlov, the eldest son of a family of Ukrainian refugees, is visiting a Brighton Beach, Brooklyn, New York, restaurant where he witnesses a Russian mobster kill two would-be assassins holding Kalashnikov rifles. The incident inspires him to go into the arms trade. After completing his first sale of an Uzi sub-machine gun to a local mobster, Yuri convinces his younger brother Vitaly to become his partner.

The two brothers get their first big break during the 1982 Lebanon War, where they sell weapons to both Israeli and Lebanese troops despite seeing the weapons used to commit atrocities. As Yuri begins to prosper by exploiting his growing network of business connections, he comes to the attention of Interpol and idealistic agent Jack Valentine, with whom he crosses paths on multiple occasions. Valentine represents a unique threat to Yuri because he is after recognition, not money, and cannot be bought.

Vitaly becomes addicted to cocaine after a Colombian drug lord forces the brothers to accept it as payment. Yuri checks Vitaly into a drug rehabilitation clinic and continues his business alone. He uses his profits to seduce his favorite model, Ava Fontaine, and they get married and have a son.

Following the dissolution of the Soviet Union, Yuri flies to Ukraine and illegally buys Soviet military hardware through his uncle, a former Soviet general who is overseeing the distribution of weapons to the newly-formed Ukrainian Army. His uncle dies in a car bombing by Yuri's rival, arms dealer Simeon Weisz. Yuri expands his business to Africa, where he supplies Andre Baptiste Sr., a bloody Liberian dictator. When Interpol has one of Yuri's shipments intercepted over Sierra Leone, he lands on a rural highway and disposes of the evidence by giving the weapons away to the locals. Baptiste surprises Yuri at his hotel and offers him a captive Weisz to kill in revenge. Yuri refuses, but Baptiste places the gun in his hand and pulls the trigger for him.

Valentine tells Ava her husband is an arms dealer, prompting her to confront him. Yuri starts trading timbers to please her but soon becomes frustrated with the difficulties and lower earnings of honest work. When Baptiste visits him in person and offers him the largest payday of his career, a stash of valuable blood diamonds, Yuri goes back to crime. Ava follows him and discovers the shipping container that contains his arms-dealing office.

Yuri picks up Vitaly to assist him with a deal in Sierra Leone, where a militia force allied with Baptiste is preparing to destroy a refugee camp. Vitaly pleads with Yuri to abandon the deal, but Yuri refuses knowing that Baptiste's men would kill them. Vitaly steals a pair of grenades and uses one to destroy a truck full of weapons, also killing Baptiste's son, before he is gunned down by the militia. Yuri is spared but receives only half of the diamonds for the remaining truckload. He watches callously as the militia massacres the refugees. Yuri pays a doctor to forge Vitaly's death certificate and remove the bullets from his body before it is shipped back to the United States, but a remaining bullet is found in customs and Yuri is arrested. When he tries to reconcile with his parents, they disown him. Ava leaves and unwittingly provides evidence against him.

Valentine detains Yuri in anticipation of his trial and conviction, but Yuri is unfazed. He tells Valentine that, in a matter of minutes, a high-ranking U.S. Army officer will arrive and insist on his release. He explains that while he may be a criminal, his crime sometimes serves the interests of the U.S. government. Valentine hears a knock at the door, considers what Yuri has said, and rebukes him.

Yuri is released and soon returns to the arms trade, claiming that it's what he does best. The film concludes with a statement that the five largest arms producers in the world—the United States, United Kingdom, Russia, China, and France—are also the five permanent members of the United Nations Security Council.

Cast
 Nicolas Cage as Yuri Orlov (largely based on the exploits of international arms dealer Viktor Bout)
 Ethan Hawke as Jack Valentine
 Jared Leto as Vitaly Orlov
 Bridget Moynahan as Ava Fontaine
 Eamonn Walker as André Baptiste Sr. (largely based on former President of Liberia, Charles Taylor)
 Sammi Rotibi as André Baptiste Jr. (largely based on Charles Taylor's son Chuckie)
 Ian Holm as Simeon Weisz (mostly based on Sarkis Soghanalian)
 Eugene Lazarev as General Dmitri Volkov
 David Harman / Neil Tweddle / Donald Sutherland (voice) as Colonel Southern, Yuri's U.S. government contact (a nod to Lt. Col. Oliver North)

Production
Andrew Niccol largely financed his production of the film with funding from outside the U.S. He claimed this was due to the highlighting of U.S. involvement in the international arms trade.

Some of the Russian language dialogues in the film (mostly those by Eugene Lazarev as Gen. Volkov) contain obscene Russian mat wording translated to softer expressions in the original English subtitles.

A scene in the film featured 50 tanks, which were provided by a Czech source. The tanks were only available until December of the year of filming, as the dealer needed them to sell in Libya. The production team bought 3,000 real SA Vz. 58 rifles to stand in for AK-47s because they were cheaper than mass-producing prop guns.

Release

Box office
The film grossed $9,390,144 on its opening weekend, ranking number three at the North American box office behind Just Like Heaven and The Exorcism of Emily Rose. After the film's 7 weeks of release, it grossed a total of $24,149,632 on the domestic market (US and Canada), and $48,467,436 internationally, for a worldwide total of $72,617,068.

Critical reception
On Rotten Tomatoes, the film has a 61% rating based on 147 reviews. The site's consensus states: "While Lord of War is an intelligent examination of the gun trade, it is too scattershot in its plotting to connect." On Metacritic, it has a score of 62% based on reviews from 31 critics, indicating "generally favorable reviews".

Roger Ebert of the Chicago Sun-Times, gave the film three and a half out of four stars, writing "After movies like Hotel Rwanda, Before the Rain and Welcome to Sarajevo, the cold cynicism of Lord of War plays like a deadly footnote."

Accolades
The film received a special mention for excellence in filmmaking from the National Board of Review.

Home media
Lord of War was released on  Blu-ray, DVD, and VHS on January 18, 2006. 

The UK DVD release of Lord of War includes, prior to the film, an advertisement for Amnesty International, showing the AK-47 being sold on a shopping channel of the style popular on cable networks. 

The American DVD release includes a bonus feature that shows the various weapons used in the film, allowing viewers to click on each weapon to get statistics about their physical dimensions and histories. The DVD bonus section also contains a public service announcement from Nicolas Cage that addresses the issue of illicit arms sales.

A 4K UHD Blu-ray transfer of Lord of War was  released on March 19, 2019.

See also
 While There's War There's Hope (1974 film), Italian film directed and starring Alberto Sordi; a film with similar subject and topic coverage
 War Dogs (2016 film), biopic about international arms dealers

References

External links

  
 
 
 
 Lord of War at JustWatch

2005 films
2005 crime thriller films
2005 crime drama films
American crime thriller films
American political drama films
German crime thriller films
German crime drama films
French crime thriller films
French crime drama films
English-language German films
English-language French films
Films about arms trafficking
Films about organized crime
Films about Interpol
Bureau of Alcohol, Tobacco, Firearms and Explosives in fiction
Crime films based on actual events
Films directed by Andrew Niccol
Films set in the 1980s
Films set in the 1990s
Films set in the 2000s
Films set in New York City
Films set in Ukraine
Films set in Berlin
Films set in Beirut
Films set in Bolivia
Films set in Colombia
Films set in Liberia
Films set in Sierra Leone
Cold War films
Lebanese Civil War films
Films shot in the Czech Republic
Lionsgate films
Metro-Goldwyn-Mayer films
Anti-war films
Saturn Films films
Films produced by Nicolas Cage
2000s political films
2000s war films
Crime war films
Films scored by Antônio Pinto
2000s American films
2000s French films
2000s German films
Films with screenplays by Andrew Niccol